Plače is a small settlement in the Vipava Valley in the Municipality of Ajdovščina in the Littoral region of Slovenia. Together with the neighbouring villages of Male Žablje and Vipavski Križ it forms the local community of Vipavski Križ.

References

External links 
Plače at Geopedia

Populated places in the Municipality of Ajdovščina